Kill The Power is the fifth studio album from Welsh rock band Skindred. It was announced on 29 April 2013, and was released on 27 January 2014. A Music video was released for "The Kids Are Right Now".

Background 
The album was announced by UK website Metal Hammer on 29 April 2013. On the subject, lead singer Benji Webbe said:

Dan Pugsley stated about the album title, "It’s more the idea that in life we have things that stand barriers, it might be a relationship or a habit and it's about facing those things, rather than it being purely political".

Track listing

Personnel

Skindred
 Benji Webbe – vocals, synthesiser
 Daniel Pugsley – bass
 Mikey Demus – guitar, backing vocals
 Arya Goggin – drums

Additional personnel
 James Loughrey – production, recording, mixing, programming
 Davide Venco – Recording engineer, mix engineer
 Cory Moore – assistant engineer
 Blair Goddard – assistant engineer
 Tim Fox – artwork
 Stronghold studios – pre-production

References

2014 albums
Skindred albums
BMG Rights Management albums